McKenzie Yei is a Papua New Guinean professional rugby league footballer who plays as a  for the Featherstone Rovers in the RFL Championship and Papua New Guinea at international level.

He previously played for the PNG Hunters and the Central Queensland Capras in the QLD Cup.

Career
Yei made his international debut for Papua New Guinea in their 24-14 victory over Fiji in the 2022 Pacific Test.
In the second group stage match at the 2021 Rugby League World Cup, Yei was sent to the sin bin for a dangerous high tackle during Papua New Guinea's 32-16 victory over the Cook Islands.

References

External links
Central Qld Capras profile

2001 births
Living people
Central Queensland Capras players
Featherstone Rovers players
Papua New Guinea Hunters players
Papua New Guinea national rugby league team players
Papua New Guinean rugby league players
Rugby league forwards
Expatriate sportspeople in England